TELO2 interacting protein 2 is a protein that in humans is encoded by the TTI2 gene.

Function

This gene encodes a regulator of the DNA damage response. The protein is a component of the Triple T complex (TTT) which also includes telomere length regulation protein and TELO2 interacting protein 1. 

The TTT complex is involved in cellular resistance to DNA damage stresses and may act as a regulator of phosphoinositide-3-kinase-related protein kinase (PIKK) abundance.

References

Further reading